"Instrumental" and "value rationality" are terms scholars use to identify two ways individuals act in order to optimize their behavior. Instrumental rationality recognizes means that "work" efficiently to achieve ends. Value rationality recognizes ends that are "right," legitimate in themselves.

These two ways of reasoning seem to operate separately. Efficient means are recognized inductively in heads or brains or minds. Legitimate ends are felt deductively in hearts or guts or souls. Instrumental rationality provides intellectual tools—scientific and technological facts and theories—that appear to be impersonal, value-free means. Value rationality provides legitimate rules—moral valuations—that appear to be emotionally satisfying, fact-free ends. Every society maintains itself by coordinating instrumental means with value rational ends. Together they make humans rational.

Sociologist Max Weber observed people exercising these capacities and gave them these labels that have stuck, despite scholars constantly coining new labels. Here are his original definitions, followed by a comment showing his doubt that humans are rational to believe that unconditionally right ends can be coordinated with conditionally efficient means.  
 

This article demonstrates the paradox of mutual contamination between instrumental and value rationality by reporting the reasoning of five scholars. Max Horkheimer linked instrumental reason with oppression. Harvard professors John Rawls and Robert Nozick, globally recognised as expert practitioners of value rationality, produced mutually incompatible theories of distributive justice. Neither is universally recognized as legitimate, but both continue to be defended as rational. Emory University professor James Gouinlock and Harvard professor Amartya Sen argued that Rawls and Nozick erred in believing that unconditionally valuable ends can work conditionally. Despite this disagreement, the scholarly community continues to accept as unavoidable this paradox of rationality contaminating itself.

Max Horkheimer
In "On the Critique of Instrumental Reason" and "Means and Ends", philosopher Max Horkheimer argued that instrumental rationality plays a key role in the oppressive industrial culture of capitalism.

John Rawls
Philosopher John Rawls accepted the reality of Weber's two kinds of rationality. He reasoned value rationally to identify unconditionally just patterns of social action capable of providing humans with a permanent instrumental moral compass. In two works, A Theory of Justice, published in 1971, and Justice as Fairness, published in 2002, he claimed to have identified one such pattern, valued both for its intrinsic legitimacy and its instrumental efficiency.

Rawls did not use Weber's labels but made Weber's distinction. He relabeled social action “institutions” to identify rational patterns of socially prescribed behavior. He relabeled instrumental rationality "the rational” to identify institutions believed to work conditionally. He relabeled value rationality "the reasonable” to identify institutions believed to be unconditionally legitimate.

Rawls recognized that individuals have conflicting interests and moral judgments. But he imagined groups of people in a hypothetical original position—stripped of personal interests and conditions—agreeing value rationally on intrinsically just institutions, forever worthy of voluntary obedience.

He searched traditional philosophies for reasonable universal propositions about justice, and adopted one as fundamental. He concluded that humans have an innate sense of fair distribution of social advantages. It provides "a workable [instrumental] and systematic moral [value-rational] conception." It overrides the "irreconcilable differences in citizens' reasonable comprehensive religious and philosophical conceptions of the world". It can replace the dominant modern school of moral philosophy, utilitarianism, that prescribes satisfaction of individual wants as unconditionally just.

Rawls reasoned that if citizens design an institution that always redistributes unplanned advantages fairly, they will sense its justice and obey it voluntarily. This reasonable institution will successfully turn instrumental means into value rational ends, forestalling contaminated rationality.

Rawls recognized that his fair institution would redistribute advantages unequally. But that unintended consequence will be just "if [it results] in compensating benefits for everyone, and in particular for the least advantaged members of society."  Community belief in this principle will provide a value rational "overlapping consensus" on instrumentally just behavior patterns.

Rawls hoped that his theory of justice would generate a rational and reasonable "overlapping consensus.” Instead, it resulted in a double paradox, neither working nor acceptable as legitimate. It failed his criterion of universal intuitive acceptance as an embodiment of justice, but he continued to endorse it. In his 1999 revision of A Theory of Justice he reasserted his faith that justice as fairness would be recognized as an instrumentally efficient institution valued “for its own sake.”

Robert Nozick
Philosopher Robert Nozick accepted the reality of Weber's two kinds of rationality. He believed that conditional means are capable of achieving unconditional ends. He did not search traditional philosophies for value rational propositions about justice, as Rawls had done, because he accepted well-established utilitarian propositions, which Rawls found unacceptable. In 1974, three years after publication of Rawls's Theory of Justice, he published Anarchy, State, and Utopia, rebutting that theory.  In 1993 he published The Nature of Rationality, refining Weber's understanding of instrumental and value rationality.

The first sentence of Anarchy, State, and Utopia asserted a value rational principle of justice: Individual want satisfaction is legitimate. 

Nozick's basic right was the principle of entitlement to just deserts.
He replaced Rawls's complex value reasoning about fair redistribution with a simple principle of distributive justice: any distribution of holdings justly acquired must be forever respected because valued for its own sake.

Humans know intuitively—before and apart from social conditions—that they want utility, along with a logical corollary that planning one's individual pursuit of utility is moral—life-fulfilling. 

The utilitarian right to satisfy individual ends does not prescribe just institutions. Instead, it creates a "moral side restraint.” It forbids social rules that require one individual to serve the interests of others. It entitles every human to be treated as a value rational end in himself, never to be used as means to ends pursued by others.

Nozick's statement of this utilitarian principle invalidated Rawls's justice as fair redistribution by definition. The behavior Rawls identified as the epitome of justice violates the right Nozick believed was the epitome of justice—a rational paradox. Rawls's institution destroys individual freedom to enjoy just deserts of pursuing one's ends with instrumentally chosen means. 

Nozick followed this rejection-by-definition with 48 pages explaining logical flaws in Rawls's just redistribution. Anarchy ended as it began, asserting that Rawls's justice as fair redistribution is unjust, and that only institutions of a minimal state—protecting established social advantages—can be just. 

Twenty years later, Nozick turned from debating value rational principles with Rawls to explaining how the human capacity for value rationality creates universal propositions capable of providing an instrumental moral compass for humanity.

He opened Nature of Rationality with a chapter heading and first sentence asking two questions. Chapter 1 was entitled "How to Do Things with Principles"; the first sentence: "What are principles for?" Translating into Weber's labels, Nozick was proposing to explain how principles—universal propositions connecting unconditional ends to conditional means—work instrumentally to identify conditionally-efficient-but-unconditionally-want-satisfying means. These connections eliminate the distinction between instrumental and value rationality.  Principles that are legitimate also "work".

Principles "work" by coordinating actions that become legitimate as their success becomes recognized. Individuals are free to apply principles they find work for them, and to behave accordingly.  Chapter 1 explained four ways that individuals use principles to coordinate group behavior instrumentally.

Nozick then moved on to explain that instrumental rationality—finally using Weber's label—cannot shape workable and just institutions by itself. Only value rationality can identify utility as a universal end. He then relabeled Weber's criteria "[instrumental] rationality of decision" and "[value] rationality of belief".

He gave instrumental rationality pride of place as "the means-ends connection" and "the efficient and effective achieving of goals". "Instrumental rationality is within the intersection of all theories of rationality... [It] is the default theory, the theory that all discussants of rationality take for granted.”” But he accepted the traditional proposition that instrumental rationality is incomplete because value-free. It only reveals value-free facts as means for pursuing fact-free self-interested utility.

By "substantive rationality of goals and desires", Nozick meant explaining how applying principles generates utility—intrinsically valuable satisfaction—for actors who accept them. This proposition required more relabeling.   

Weber's "instrumental rationality" and Rawls's "the rational" became actors' "causally expected utility"—satisfaction with workmanlike behavior—and "evidentially expected utility"—satisfaction with predicted utility after successful instrumental action.  Weber's "value rationality" and Rawls's “the reasonable” became actors' "symbolic utility"—satisfaction with behavior that, in itself, symbolizes universal justice. Jointly, these three sorts of utility establish the social measure of “decision value”—instrumentally successful moral actions.

"Even if rationality were understood and explained only as instrumental rationality, that rationality can come to be valued in part for itself ... and so come to have intrinsic [fact-free] value.

Nozick's assertion of a value rational human right to pursue individual utility resulted in the same double paradox as Rawls’s institution of justice as fairness. He admitted that it was not rationally persuasive — "most people I know and respect disagree with me"— but continued to believe that both instrumental and value rationality are universally known to satisfy human wants. Neither expert in value rationality was able to convince the other with contaminated reason.

James Gouinlock
Philosopher James Gouinlock does not believe in the reality of Weber's two kinds of rationality. He became a critic of the separation between instrumental and value rationality while describing and extending John Dewey's efforts to understand human intelligence.  Belief in two criteria for reasoning was one of many popular dualism against which he and Dewey railed.  They did not believe anything could be valued in isolation—good “for its own sake.”

In his introduction to volume two of Dewey's collected works, John Dewey The Later Works 1925–53, published in 1984, Gouinlock criticized the modern practice of value rationality as represented by Rawls and Nozick. He developed that criticism in his 1993 study, Rediscovering the Moral Life. In 2004, he published Eros and the Good, describing his personal effort to eliminate the dualism. 

Gouinlock's 1984 introduction never used Weber's labels “instrumental and value rationality.” Instead, it distinguished Dewey's explanation of rationality—itself sometimes labeled "instrumentalism" and identified with "pragmatism"—from two traditional schools of philosophy that assumed divided rationality: rationalism and classical empiricism.

 

Rationalists are prone to favor Weber's value rationality. They assume a human deductive capacity for immediate knowledge of meaningful beliefs and behaviors—fact-free human ends. Empiricists, by contrast, favor Weber's instrumental rationality. They assume a human inductive capacity to recognize how brute facts work as value-free means.

Gouinlock explained Dewey's reasons for rejecting both poles of this traditional division. He quoted from a Dewey article on pragmatism to show how Dewey replaced value rational objects, labeled by Rawls “institutions” and by Nozick “principles” with “general ideas”—an intellectual tool relating means to conditional ends serially and inter-independently.

Dewey wrote of "intelligence" rather than “rationality" because he considered reasoning to be a two-step way of thinking, not two distinct structural capacities. It involves endless linking of available means to proposed ends.  Gouinlock wrote: "Realization of the good life [a contextual end for Dewey, not Nozick’s universal want satisfaction] depends … on the exercise of intelligence. Indeed, his instrumentalism ... is a theory concerning the nature of intelligent conduct." 

Gouinlock criticized Rawls and Nozick for contaminating conditional instrumental reasoning by isolating value rational principles of truth and justice from experienced conditions.[9]:xxx, xxxv-vi

Dewey's “general ideas” were not pre-known legitimate ends actors intended to achieve. They were hypothetical visions of ways of acting that might solve existing problems developmentally, restoring coordinated behavior in conditions that obstruct it. They visualize where a situation should go; what “from here to there” looks like.

In Rediscovering the Moral Life, Gouinlock again criticized Rawls and Nozick for imagining value rational principles in their heads, while ignoring facts of human nature and real-life moral conditions. He listed traditional forms of value-rationality, all of which he found incompetent to serve humans as moral compass.

Gouinlock's "additional considerations" ignored claims that legitimate ends work by maximizing utility. His virtues must solve problems developmentally. Instead of trying to identify eternally legitimate institutions, he searched for continuity in virtuous ways of behaving.

By treating rationality as a criterion for judging means-ends working to produce developmental consequences, Gouinlock gave practical meaning to Dewey's instrumentally reasoning: "For the virtue of rationality I ask no more than a sincere attempt to seek the truth relevant to a given situation."

Amartya Sen
Early in the 21st century, economist Amartya Sen expressed doubts about the separation of instrumental from value rationality, similar to doubts Max Weber expressed early in the 20th century. In 2002 he published a collection of his papers under the title Rationality and Freedom to explain how these two normative conceptions are conditional and inter-related.  In 2009 he published The Idea of Justice, questioning whether unconditional value rationality used inconclusively by Harvard colleagues Rawls and Nozick is legitimate at all. He recognized that the alternative to human rationality is rarely insanity. It is more often conceptions that contaminate reasoning.

In Rationality and Freedom, Sen defined rationality as a discipline "subjecting one's choicesof [instrumental] actions as well as of [value rational] objectives, values and prioritiesto reasoned scrutiny". More forcefully than Weber, he questioned the rationality of believing that unconditionally legitimate ends can be coordinated with conditionally efficient means. He essentially made both instrumental and value rationality conditional, eliminating the paradox of reason contaminating reason. To scrutinize choices seems to mean treating them as hypotheses to be tested, not as knowledge already acquired.  All knowledge is conditional, subject to revision. 

Sen relabeled instrumental and value rationality by naming their traditional defects. Weber's value-rationality became "process-independent" reasoning. It ignores instrumental means as it judges intended consequences: "the goodness of outcomes" always valuable in themselves.  Its use produces fact-free intrinsically good knowledge. Weber's instrumental rationality became "consequence-independent" theory, because its practitioners develop "right procedures”instrumental means for reasoningwithout evaluating ends.  Its use produces value-free facts. His message was that rationality requires using "both the [instrumental] 'dueness' of processes and the [value-rational] 'goodness of narrowly defined 'outcomes.'"

Sen showed the paradox of believing in fact-free ends and value-free means. Economists have developed a model of "rational action" that creates "rational fools” of both social scientists and the people they study. Sen called the scientist an "instrumental rationalist."

Imagine a scientist observing a man happily cutting off his toes with a blunt knife. Does the scholar judge the man rational or not?  Forbidden by the axiom that want satisfaction is good in itself, the scientist can only judge means.

Regarding his colleagues Rawls and Nozick, Sen was little critical of their practice of instrumental rationality, but quite critical of their practice of value rationality. Their theories were largely “consequence-independent”fact-free, correct regardless of actual consequences. "Justice as fairness" and "Entitlement theory" are "not only non-consequentialist but they also seem to leave little room for taking substantive note of consequences in modifying or qualifying the rights covered by these principles."

He proposed new terms for Weber's two kinds of rationality, relating them to specific flaws he found in the reasoning of Rawls and Nozick. He labeled their instrumental rationality "transcendental institutionalism" and "arrangement-focused" analysis, prescribing fact-free patterns of coordinated behavior assumed to be instrumentally efficient without conditions.

For Rawls, there are eternally and universally just rules of fairness: "comprehensive goals,... deliberately chosen ... through an ethical examination of how one 'should' act [value-rationally].  For Nozick there are eternally and universally right rules that cover personal liberties as well as rights of holding, using, exchanging, and bequeathing legitimately owned property."

In Idea of Justice, Sen asked “What is the role of [instrumental] rationality and of [value-rational] reasonableness in understanding the demands of justice?” He rejected the search for a theory of perfect justice in favor of a search for practical means to reduce injustice.

Sen's analysis was complex, but not his message. He concluded that both instrumental rationality and value-rationality are capable of error. Neither premises nor conclusions about means or ends are ever beyond criticism.  Nothing can be taken as relevant or valid in itself. All valuations must be constantly reaffirmed in the continuity of rational inquiry. "We have to get on with the basic task of obtaining workable rules [means] that satisfy reasonable requirements [conditional ends]."  

Belief in value rationalityunconditionally true and just knowledgecontinues to contaminate conditional instrumental rationality.

See also 
 Categorical imperative
 Communicative rationality
 Fact–value distinction
 Instrumental and intrinsic value
 Instrumental and value-rational action
 Instrumentalism
 Objectivity (philosophy)
 Rationalisation (social process)

References

Critical theory
Social philosophy
Sociological terminology